Harry Potter and the Goblet of Fire is a novel by J. K. Rowling.

Harry Potter and the Goblet of Fire may also refer to:
 Harry Potter and the Goblet of Fire (film), the novel's film adaptation, directed by Mike Newell
 Harry Potter and the Goblet of Fire (soundtrack), the soundtrack based on the film, composed by Patrick Doyle
 Harry Potter and the Goblet of Fire (video game), a video game based on the film